Joe McGrath (born November 27, 1980) is a former professional Canadian football offensive tackle. He was drafted by the Stampeders in the first round of the 2003 CFL Draft. He played college football for the Miami Hurricanes.

Early years
McGrath was coached by his father at Vanier Collegiate Institute in Moose Jaw and was considered an all-star in both football and basketball and the number two Canadian high school lineman at graduation.

McGrath played college football from 1999 through 2003 for the Miami Hurricanes, three years as a regular at left guard. He won a national championship with the Hurricanes in 2001.

Professional career

First stint with Eskimos
McGrath was drafted second overall in the 2003 CFL Draft by the Calgary Stampeders but was signed by the Edmonton Eskimos as a free agent on July 7, 2004. He appeared in 15 games at left tackle in the 2004 CFL season, all 18 regular season games plus the playoffs and the victory in the 93rd Grey Cup in 2005 CFL season, and started all 18 regular season games in the 2006 CFL season. He was nominated by the Eskimos for the CFL's Most Outstanding Offensive Lineman Award in 2006.

Saskatchewan Roughriders
On February 16, 2009, McGrath became a free agent and was reportedly signed the same day by the Saskatchewan Roughriders.

Second stint with Eskimos
McGrath requested a trade back to Edmonton and his request was granted on June 11, 2009. He was released on August 11, 2010.

BC Lions
On August 19, 2010, the BC Lions added the recently released McGrath to the offensive line. He was released during the following off-season on May 24, 2011.

Calgary Stampeders
On October 18, 2011, McGrath was signed to the practice roster of the Calgary Stampeders.

References 

1980 births
Living people
Canadian football offensive linemen
American football offensive linemen
Canadian players of American football
Edmonton Elks players
Saskatchewan Roughriders players
BC Lions players
Calgary Stampeders players
Miami Hurricanes football players
Players of Canadian football from Saskatchewan
Sportspeople from Moose Jaw